Caher Castle may refer to:
Caherkinmonwee Castle, County Galway, Ireland
Cahir Castle, County Tipperary, Ireland